"Mama's Song" is a song by Carrie Underwood, composed by Kara DioGuardi / Luke Laird / Marti Frederiksen.

Mama's Song may also refer to
"Mama's Song" by Lynyrd Skynyrd, composed by Rossington Thomasson Van Zant Medlocke from Christmas Time Again
"Mama's Song" by Kirk Franklin & the Family, composed Franklin from Whatcha Lookin' 4
"Mama's Song" by The Heptones and Nicky Thomas	1974
"Mama's Song" by Jackie DeShannon, composed by Buddy Buie / James Cobb from Put a Little Love in Your Heart
"Mama's Song", song by Billy Joe Royal from Cherry Hill Park 1970
"Mama's Song", by John Cale from Music for a New Society
"Be Thankful (Mama's Song)", by Loose Ends from Zagora